High Lonesome is the eighth studio album by Charlie Daniels and the fifth as the Charlie Daniels Band, released on November 5, 1976.  Many of the tracks pay homage to pulp Western fiction and, with permission, the album's title was named after the 1962 Western novel by Louis L’Amour.

Track listing 
All songs composed by the Charlie Daniels Band (Charlie Daniels, Tom Crain, Taz DiGregorio, Fred Edwards, Charles Hayward & Don Murray), except where indicated:

Side one
 "Billy the Kid" (Daniels) – 5:49
 "Carolina" – 3:54
 "High Lonesome" – 5:03
 "Running With the Crowd" – 4:01

Side two
 "Right Now Tennessee Blues" (Daniels) – 3:36
 "Roll Mississippi" – 3:12
 "Slow Song" (Daniels) – 3:55
 "Tennessee" (Crain) – 4:43
 "Turned My Head Around" – 3:52

All of the credits above are direct from the original 1976 Epic LP.  There has been some confusion as to certain of the album's songwriting credits over time because sites like AllMusic have incorrectly modified the credits by incorporating songs with the same titles together.  For example, "Billy the Kid".  "Dean" is shown as a co-writer  sometimes now because Billy Dean released a song with the same title in 1991. Another example is "High Lonesome", which was written by the Charlie Daniels Band. Allmusic now incorrectly cites Gretchen Peters as a co-writer.  This is because she wrote a song called "High Lonesome" in 1991 for Randy Travis's album, High Lonesome.  Yet another case is with the song "Birmingham Blues" that Charlie Daniels wrote for their 1975 album, Nightrider. In 1977, Jeff Lynne also wrote a song called "Birmingham Blues" for his band, Electric Light Orchestra's album, Out of the Blue, and now Allmusic shows the 1975 Charlie Daniels song as being co-written by Lynne (but not the other way around), which is nonsensical.  But once one authoritative site publishes incorrect data, the scrapers spread it around the internet as factual.

Personnel
The Charlie Daniels Band:
 Charlie Daniels – acoustic guitar, banjo, fiddle, guitar, violin, electric guitar, vocals, slide guitar
 Tom Crain – acoustic guitar, electric guitar, vocals, slide guitar, vocal harmony, lead vocals on "Tennessee"
 Taz DiGregorio – organ, piano, keyboards, vocals, vocal harmony, lead vocals on "Roll Mississippi"
 Fred Edwards – congas, drums
 Charlie Hayward – bass guitar
 Don Murray – congas, drums

Additional musicians:
 George McCorkle – acoustic guitar on "Billy The Kid"
 Toy Caldwell – steel guitar on "Slow Song" and "Tennessee"

Production personnel:
 Paul Hornsby – producer
 Kurt Kinzel – engineer
 Richard Schoff – assistant engineer
 Don Rubin – executive producer
 George Marino – mastering
 Joseph E. Sullivan – production supervisor

References

1976 albums
Charlie Daniels albums
Albums produced by Paul Hornsby
Epic Records albums